Henry Hylton, de jure 12th Baron Hylton (1586 – 30 March 1641) was an English nobleman.

Hylton was the eldest son of Thomas Hylton (himself the son of William Hylton, de jure 11th Baron Hylton) and his wife, Anne née Bowes (daughter of Sir George Bowes of Streatlam Castle). In 1600, Hylton inherited the right to the barony of Hylton from his grandfather.

Sources
Henry Hylton b.1585 - AncestryUK.com
The Gentlemen's Magazine, March 1821

Barons in the Peerage of England
1586 births
1641 deaths